The 1971 European Amateur Boxing Championships  were held in Madrid, Spain from 11 June to 19 June. The 19th edition of the bi-annual competition was organised by the European governing body for amateur boxing, EABA. There were 194 fighters from 27 countries participating.

Medal winners

Medal table

External links
Results
Amateur Boxing

European Amateur Boxing Championships
Box
European Amateur Boxing Championships
Boxing
Sports competitions in Madrid
European Amateur Boxing Championships
European Amateur Boxing Championships, 1971